The Proceedings of the Association of American Physicians was an American medical journal founded in 1886 as the Transactions of the Association of American Physicians. It changed its name in 1996 and ceased publication in 1999.

External links
 National Library of Medicine entry for the "Transactions"
 National Library of Medicine entry for the "Proceedings"

Publications established in 1886
Wiley-Blackwell academic journals
Publications disestablished in 1999
General medical journals